Julius H. Comroe, Jr. (March 13, 1911 – July 31, 1984) was a surgeon, medical researcher, author and educator,  described by The New York Times as an "award-winning expert on the functions and physiology of the human heart and lungs". His work contributed to advances in respiratory physiology, cardiology, heart and vascular surgery, and the treatment of pulmonary disease, hypertension and high blood pressure.

Comroe became a professor at the University of Pennsylvania in 1936. He was chairman of the Department of Physiology and Pharmacology at the university's Graduate School of Medicine from 1946-1957.   From 1957-1973 Comroe served as the founding director of the Cardiovascular Research Institute (CVRI)  at the University of California, San Francisco. In 1974 he retired as director and was named the Morris Herzstein Professor of Biology.

In addition to being a fellow of the 
American College of Physicians, the National Academy of Sciences, and the American Academy of Arts and Sciences, Comroe was an Honorary member of the Royal Society of Medicine the American Physiological Society, and The Physiological Society of London. The annual distinguished lectureship for outstanding research in respiratory physiology at the American Physiological Society is named in Dr Comroe’s honor.

Education 
Julius Hiram Comroe, Jr. was born in York, Pennsylvania. (Both his father Julius H.Comroe and his older brother Bernard Comroe were medical doctors.) 
In 1931 he graduated first in his class from the University of Pennsylvania.
In 1934, he graduated first in his class from the UPenn Medical School with an M.D. degree.
He became an intern at the Hospital of the University of Pennsylvania, intending to become a surgeon, but had to give up that goal after he lost one of his eyes to an infection.

Career
In 1936 Comroe became an instructor at the Department of Pharmacology at the University of Pennsylvania's  School of Medicine. He was promoted to Associate in 1940  and Assistant Professor in 1942. His work was considered "the definitive work on the aortic chemoreceptors".  

During World War II, between 1944 and 1946, Comroe also worked with the Chemical Warfare Service.  For example, he used diisopropyl fluorophosphate as a  model for the effects of more lethal nerve gas on the eye. 

When  the University of Pennsylvania formed the Department of Physiology and Pharmacology in the Graduate School of Medicine in 1946, Comroe became both professor and chairman of the new department. Under his direction, it focused on the field of respiratory physiology.
Between 1946-1957, Comroe continued to study breathing. With his colleagues, he developed scientific instrumentation and methods for evaluating human respiratory performance under normal conditions, while exercising, and during illness. Many of the  pulmonary function tests still used are based on this work.  Comroe investigated topics including reflex control of breathing,  rate and depth of breathing, and the effects of drugs and oxygen. He and anesthesiologist Robert Dunning Dripps showed that the method of manual artificial respiration used at that time was inefficient, which eventually led to its replacement by mouth-to-mouth resuscitation.

In 1957 Comroe moved to the University of California, San Francisco to become Director of its new Cardiovascular Research Institute (CVRI) and professor of physiology. From 1957-1973 he continued his research into cardiac and pulmonary function. At the same time, he developed a highly respected program for postdoctoral training and teaching in medicine and physiology. As a medical educator he emphasized the interdisciplinarity of science, the importance of basic research, and the integration of research into clinical departments.  In 1974 he stepped down as director and was named the Morris Herzstein Professor of Biology.

Comroe published both research papers and books, including The Lung  (1955, 1962), Physiology of Respiration (1965, 1974), the series Physiology for Physicians, and Exploring the heart (1983).  From 1966-1970 he edited the journal Circulation Research. From 1972–1975 he was the editor of the peer-reviewed journal Annual Review of Physiology.

Comroe was a founder of the Institute of Medicine (later National Academy of Medicine). He was a member of the National Academy of Sciences, and served on the Medical Board of the National Academy of Sciences. Comroe became a member of the American Physiological Society  in 1943, served on its council and committees, and was its  president for 1960-1961.

Comroe served on a number of national-level scientific advisory boards, including  
the National Advisory  Heart  Council,  the Board of  Scientific  Counselors  of the  National  Heart Institute, and the National Advisory  Mental  Health Council. 
In 1954, Comroe was appointed to the scientific advisory board of the Tobacco Industry Research Committee. He expressed repeated dissatisfaction with its operations and public statements, and resigned in 1960.
Comroe also served on national-level educational committees of the  American Society for  Pharmacology  and  Experimental  Therapeutics and the American Physiological Society.

Books
   
  (1955, 1962)
  (1965, 1974)

Awards and distinctions 
 1957, Fellow, American College of Physicians
 1961, Member, National Academy of Sciences
 1964, Fellow, American Academy of Arts and Sciences
 1968, Honorary Fellow, American College of Cardiology
 1968, Research Achievement Award, American Heart Association
 1970, Founding Member, Institute of Medicine
 1971, Fellow, Royal College of Physicians of London
1974, ACDP Teaching Award, Association of Chairmen of Departments of Physiology
1974, Edward Livingston Trudeau Medal. American Thoracic Society/American Lung Association
 1975, Gold Heart Award of the American Heart Association
1976,  Jessie Stevenson Kovalenko Medal, National Academy of Sciences
 1977, Harriet P. Dustan Award, American College of Physicians
 1977, Ray G. Daggs Award, American Physiological Society
 1978, UCSF medal, University of California, San Francisco
 1979, Eugenio Morelli International Award, Accademia dei Lincei
 1980, Honorary member, Royal Society of Medicine
 1981, Presidential Citation, American College of Cardiology
 1984, Honorary member, The Physiological Society (London)

References

External links
National Academy of Sciences Biographical Memoir

1911 births
1984 deaths
American physiologists
Members of the United States National Academy of Sciences
Annual Reviews (publisher) editors
Members of the National Academy of Medicine
Circulation Research editors